Syed Naveed Qamar (born 22 September 1955) is a Pakistani politician who has been a member of the National Assembly of Pakistan since August 2018. Previously, he was a member of the National Assembly between 1990 and May 2018. He served as Minister for Defence and Minister for Finance between 2008 and 2013.

Early life and education

Qamar was born in Karachi, Sindh on 22 September 1955 to the former Deputy Speaker of the Sindh Assembly Qamar-uz-Zaman Shah.

Qamar received his B.Sc (Hons) degree in Computer Science from Manchester University in 1976. He did his MS in Management from Northrop University in 1978 and received his MBA degree from California State University in 1979.

Qamar is married and has three daughters and a son.

Political career

Qamar began his political career by electing to the Provincial Assembly of Sindh in 1988 Pakistani general election on Pakistan Peoples Party's platform from PS-37 Hyderabad, where he served from 19 November 1988 till 6 August 1990. He held the portfolio as Provincial Minister of Sindh for Information.

He was elected to the National Assembly of Pakistan in 1990 Pakistani general election on PPP ticket.

He was re-elected to the National Assembly in 1993 Pakistani general election on PPP ticket and became chairman of the Privatisation Commission of Pakistan.

He was re-elected to the National Assembly in 1997 Pakistani general election on PPP ticket and was appointed as the Federal Minister for Finance and Privatisation.

He was re-elected to the National Assembly in 2002 Pakistani general election on PPP ticket from NA-222.

He was re-elected to the National Assembly in 2008 Pakistani general election from NA-222 constituency on PPP ticket and was made Federal Minister for Privatisation with the additional portfolio of Port and Shipping. He also briefly held the portfolio of Federal Minister for Finance for five months in 2008.

In August 2009, he was made Federal Minister for Petroleum & Natural Resources with additional charge of Minister for Privatisation. He was removed from the post of Federal Minister for Petroleum & Natural Resources and was given portfolio of Ministry of Water and Power in March 2011. In 2011, he was made Federal Minister for Defence.

He was re-elected to the National Assembly from NA-222 constituency on PPP ticket in 2013 Pakistani general election. He served as the Chairman Standing Committee on Railways from 2013 till 2018. In 2016, he was made Parliamentary Leader of PPP in the National Assembly, where he served until 2018.

After Nawaz Sharif resigned as Prime Minister of Pakistan in July 2017, Qamar was nominated by PPP as the party's candidate for the office of Prime Minister. He secured 47 votes by the National Assembly members against his PML (N) candidate Shahid Khaqan Abbasi who secured 221 votes.

He was re-elected to the National Assembly as a candidate of PPP from Constituency NA-228 (Tando Muhammad Khan) in 2018 Pakistani general election. He is serving as the Chairman Standing Committee on Commerce from September 2018.

References 

|-

|-

1955 births
Finance Ministers of Pakistan
Government of Yousaf Raza Gillani
Living people
Pakistan People's Party politicians
Sindhi people
Water and Power Ministers of Pakistan
Northrop University alumni
California State University, Los Angeles alumni
Alumni of the University of Manchester
Pakistani MNAs 2013–2018
Pakistani MNAs 1990–1993
Pakistani MNAs 1993–1996
Pakistani MNAs 1997–1999
Pakistani MNAs 2002–2007
Pakistani MNAs 2008–2013
Pakistani MNAs 2018–2023